North Down is a parliamentary constituency in the United Kingdom House of Commons. The current MP is Stephen Farry of the Alliance Party. Farry was elected to the position in the 2019 general election, replacing the incumbent Sylvia Hermon. Hermon had held the position since being elected to it in the 2001 general election, but chose not to contest in 2019.

Constituency profile
North Down covers the north coast of the Ards Peninsula including Bangor which has several Alliance councillors. Historically a unionist area, North Down is currently the only seat in Northern Ireland represented by a non-aligned party.

Boundaries

1885–1918: The baronies of Castlereagh Lower, Lower Ards, and Upper Ards, that part of the barony of Castlereagh Upper in the parishes of Comber and Knockbreda, and that part of the parliamentary borough of Belfast lying in County Down.

1918-1922: The Urban Districts of Bangor, Donaghadee and Newtownards, and that part of the Rural District of Newtownards not contained within the Mid Down division.

1950–1974: The Boroughs of Bangor and Newtownards, the Urban Districts of Donaghadee and Holywood, and the Rural Districts of Castlereagh, Hillsborough, and Newtownards.

1974–1983: The Boroughs of Bangor and Newtownards, the Urban Districts of Donaghadee and Holywood, the Rural District of North Down, in the Rural District of Castlereagh the district electoral divisions of Ballycultra, Craigavad, and Holywood Rural, and in the Rural District of Hillsborough the district electoral divisions of Annahilt, Ballykeel, Ballymacbrennan, Ballyskeagh, Ballyworfy, Blaris, Carryduff, Dromara, Drumbo, Glassdrumman, Hillsborough, Maze, Ouley, and Saintfield.

1983–1997: The District of North Down, and the District of Castlereagh wards of Ballyhanwood, Carrowreagh, Dundonald, Enler, Gilnahirk, and Tullycarnet.

1997–present: The District of North Down, and the District of Ards wards of Donaghadee North, Donaghadee South, and Millisle.

The county constituency was first created in 1885 from the northern part of Down.  From the dissolution of Parliament in 1922, it was merged back into that constituency.

The seat was re-created in 1950 when the old two MP Down constituency was abolished as part of the move to single member seats. Originally the seat consisted of most of the northern parts of County Down, with the south included in South Down. In January 1980, the Boundary Commission's original proposals suggested significantly reducing the size of the constituency and renaming it 'Loughside' on the grounds that this would avoid confusion in the event of borough council elections being held on the same day. As a result, in 1983 the seat was radically cut down as part of an expansion of Northern Ireland's constituencies from 12 to 17, although the name remained unaltered. Significant parts of the constituency were transferred to the new Strangford constituency. In boundary changes proposed by a review in 1995, the seat exchanged territory with Strangford, losing the Dundonald area from Castlereagh and gaining a part of Ards.

The seat now contains the entirety of North Down district as well as Donaghadee and Millisle in Ards.

In 2005, the Boundary Commission published provisional recommendations for modifying the boundaries of constituencies in Northern Ireland. No changes were proposed for North Down. This proved acceptable at the public enquiries and the Assistant Commissioner also recommended no change to the constituency meaning that the constituency is to remain unchanged.

History

1885 to 1922
The constituency was a strongly unionist area being held by the Irish Unionist Party. Neither the Nationalist Party or Sinn Féin contested the seat in 1918.

The First Dáil
Sinn Féin contested the general election of 1918 on the platform that instead of taking up any seats they won in the Imperial Parliament, they would establish a revolutionary assembly in Dublin. In republican theory, every MP elected in Ireland was a potential Deputy to this assembly. In practice, only the Sinn Féin members accepted the offer; there was no Sinn Féin or other Irish nationalist candidate in North Down in 1918.

The revolutionary First Dáil assembled on 21 January 1919 and last met on 10 May 1921. The First Dáil, according to a resolution passed on 10 May 1921, was formally dissolved on the assembling of the Second Dáil. This took place on 16 August 1921.

In 1921 Sinn Féin decided to use the UK authorised elections for the Northern Ireland House of Commons and the House of Commons of Southern Ireland as a poll for the Irish Republic's Second Dáil. The constituency was incorporated into the eight-member constituency of Down, and saw the President of Dáil Éireann, Éamon de Valera, elected there.  The constituency also elected the first Prime Minister of Northern Ireland, Sir James Craig, to the Parliament of Northern Ireland.

1950 to present
North Down is one of the most overwhelmingly unionist parts of Northern Ireland, with nationalist parties routinely getting no more than 5% of the vote, if that. In the 1955 election George Currie, the Ulster Unionist candidate, gained 96.8% of the popular vote, which he "bettered" in 1959 with some 98%. These shares of the popular votes are the highest ever achieved in a United Kingdom general election (post 1832 Reform). However it has arguably the most volatile and unpredictable politics of the entire province. Whereas elsewhere there are effectively three fundamental battles fought in elections – between the Ulster Unionist Party and the Democratic Unionist Party to be the leading unionist party, between the Social Democratic and Labour Party and Sinn Féin to be the leading nationalist party, and between unionism and nationalism as a whole, North Down is different. The lack of any substantial nationalist vote renders the last two battles immaterial. Of Northern Ireland's five main parties, only the Ulster Unionist Party and the Alliance Party of Northern Ireland have historically had a significant organisation and support in the constituency, though the Democratic Unionist Party has recently started to gain a foothold where previously it was nearly non-existent.

In addition the constituency has seen many substantial votes for smaller party groupings and individuals. The Ulster Popular Unionist Party, the Conservative Party, the UK Unionist Party and the Northern Ireland Women's Coalition have all polled substantially in the last fifteen years, whilst in local council elections many independent candidates gain sufficient votes to be elected. The area is the heartland of numerous "one-man parties", of which the Ulster Popular Unionist Party and the UK Unionist Party are the best known but far from the only ones. There have been many examples of elected individuals changing party allegiance and often successfully defending their seats for the new party.

The constituency is the most prosperous in Northern Ireland and is widely considered to be the most similar to an English constituency. In part because of this the seat was the heartland of the Equal Citizenship campaign in the late 1980s which argued that political parties in Britain should organise and contest elections in Northern Ireland, in the hope that this would "normalise" the politics of the province. The Conservative Party established itself (having in earlier years been in alliance with the Ulster Unionist Party until a breakdown in relations in the 1970s) and to date has been relatively strongest in North Down though in recent years its vote has declined heavily from the brief surge in the elections held between 1989 and 1992.

Traditionally levels of turnout in elections are very low by Northern Ireland standards, possibly because the lack of a serious threat of a nationalist victory removes the impetus to vote common among unionists elsewhere in the province. The one significant exception to the levels of turnout was the 1998 referendum on the Good Friday Agreement where turnout reached 80%, a total not come close to since 1921.

The parliamentary constituency was original held by the Ulster Unionist Party with no serious opposition. In 1970 James Kilfedder was first elected and he proceeded to accumulate a high level of personal popularity in the constituency. In 1977 he left the Ulster Unionists in protest over their increasing support for Enoch Powell's proposed policy of integration for Northern Ireland, rather than the restoration of devolved government. Standing as an independent Unionist, Kilfedder successfully defended his seat against a UUP challenge in the 1979 general election. The following year he formed the Ulster Popular Unionist Party, with a few local councillors being elected on the label.

Kilfedder continued to hold his seat. Then in the 1987 general election he agreed an electoral pact with the Ulster Unionists and the Democratic Unionist Party to form a united opposition to the Anglo-Irish Agreement. However the local UUP candidate, Robert McCartney, was opposed to this pact and refused to withdraw. He was expelled from the UUP and so stood as a "Real Unionist" on a platform of complete integration for the province. Kilfedder retained the seat but with a reduced majority. As part of his platform for integration, McCartney had called for the major UK parties to organise and stand in the province and his result gave impetus to this campaign.

The Conservative Party did very well in the 1989 local elections for North Down Borough Council when they became the largest party. They stood candidates in several Northern Ireland constituencies in the 1992 general election, but their strongest prospect was expected to be North Down. Kilfedder by this stage was taking the Conservative whip at Westminster and so was aggrieved by this (and subsequently given a knighthood). In the event the result was similar to 1987, with the Conservatives getting a similar vote to McCartney.

Kilfedder died in 1995 and his loose Ulster Popular Unionist Party faded away even before the resulting by-election. By this time the Northern Ireland Conservatives had collapsed heavily and so there was much speculation about how the by-election would go. The Ulster Unionist Party were hopeful that they could retake the seat, but McCartney also stood, this time as a "UK Unionist" with the support of the Democratic Unionist Party. No candidate stood for the Popular Unionists or any nationalist party. There was a poor turnout in which McCartney won, with the Conservative vote collapsing from 32% to 2.1%.

McCartney further established his UK Unionist Party and sought to challenge the existing unionist parties by offering a less sectarian alternative. He held his seat in the 1997 election and was also elected to both the Northern Ireland Peace Forum in 1996 and the Northern Ireland Assembly in 1998, though on each occasion he was the only UK Unionist elected from North Down. In the 1998 Assembly election the Ulster Unionists had their strongest result in the province and there was much speculation that they could unseat McCartney at the next general election.

A rather public row erupted over the selection of the UUP's candidate. Initially the local assembly member Peter Weir was selected, but his opposition to the Good Friday Agreement and David Trimble's leadership became very prominent and a running source of embarrassment to the party. Then Weir was deselected and the new candidate selected, Sylvia Hermon, was supportive of both Trimble and the Agreement. Hermon, aided by the Alliance standing aside, won the seat.

Weir remained as an Assembly member but subsequently defected to the Democratic Unionist Party. In the 2003 Assembly election Weir successfully defended his seat for the DUP, who also gained another MLA from the Northern Ireland Women's Coalition. In the 2005 general election the party battle was altered somewhat by the DUP running Weir, the Alliance putting up a candidate and McCartney, after some speculation, deciding not to stand but to instead endorse Weir. In a strong contest Hermon retained the seat, to become the only Ulster Unionist MP at the time, though she later left that party. She retained her seat at the 2010 election as an independent with the second-biggest margin of any Northern Irish MP (behind Gerry Adams in Belfast West) and was re-elected at the 2015 and 2017 elections, although her majority was considerably reduced.

Hermon retired at the 2019 election. The bulk of her support shifted to the Alliance, and a split unionist vote allowed Alliance candidate Stephen Farry to capture the seat, becoming the Alliance's only MP.

Members of Parliament 

The Member of Parliament since the 2019 general election is Stephen Farry of the Alliance Party of Northern Ireland, who won the seat after the retirement of Sylvia Hermon.

Elections

Elections in the 2010s 

Sylvia Hermon resigned the UUP whip in 2010, in protest against that party's electoral pact with the NI Conservatives to form UCU-NF.

Elections in the 2000s

Elections in the 1990s 

The figures and result are compared to the 1992 general election, not the 1995 by-election.

Elections in the 1980s 

In 1980 Kilfedder formed the small Ulster Popular Unionist Party and contested all subsequent elections under this label.

Elections in the 1970s 

Kilfedder left the Ulster Unionists in 1977, in opposition to Enoch Powell's proposals for integration instead of devolution for Northern Ireland, and defended his seat as an Independent Ulster Unionist. The new Ulster Unionist candidate was Clifford Smyth, who had previously been a Democratic Unionist Party assembly member in North Antrim.

Elections in the 1960s

Elections in the 1950s

Elections in the 1920s

Elections in the 1910s

Elections in the 1900s

Elections in the 1890s

Elections in the 1880s

See also 
 List of parliamentary constituencies in Northern Ireland

References

Bibliography
Guardian Unlimited Politics (Election results from 1992 to the present)
http://www.psr.keele.ac.uk/ (Election results from 1951 to the present)

F. W. S. Craig, British Parliamentary Election Results 1950 – 1970
The Liberal Year Book For 1917, Liberal Publication Department
The Constitutional Year Book For 1912, Conservative Central Office
The Constitutional Year Book For 1894, Conservative Central Office

External links 
Politics Resources (Election results from 1922 onwards)
Electoral Calculus (Election results from 1955 onwards)
2017 Election House Of Commons Library 2017 Election report
A Vision Of Britain Through Time (Constituency elector numbers)
UK Constituency Maps
BBC Vote 2001
BBC Election 2005
 http://www.oireachtas.ie/members-hist/default.asp?housetype=0
 http://historical-debates.oireachtas.ie/en.toc.dail.html

Politics of County Down
Westminster constituencies in County Down (historic)
Dáil constituencies in Northern Ireland (historic)
Constituencies of the Parliament of the United Kingdom established in 1885
Constituencies of the Parliament of the United Kingdom disestablished in 1922
Constituencies of the Parliament of the United Kingdom established in 1950
Westminster Parliamentary constituencies in Northern Ireland
1885 establishments in Ireland
1950 establishments in Northern Ireland